Dublin Street Songs and Through Dublin City are LPs of mostly traditional Irish songs by Frank Harte. Dublin Street Songs was Frank Harte's first LP recording in 1967, having been recorded in two days  earlier that year by Bill Leader in the UK at the same time as the tracks that were to become Through Dublin City, which was issued on the Topic label in 1973.

The CD is largely made up of traditional Irish songs, though there are some exceptions such as "Henry My Son", which is listed as a "European Ballad".

A CD amalgamating both albums was published in 2004. The full track list on this album contains all songs on the LPs except - because of CD space limitations - for "Traveller All Over the World" which was not included on the re-issue.

Track list
 "Henry My Son" see Lord Randal
 "The Night of the Ragman's Ball"
 "The Shamrock Shore"
 "The Bold Belfast Shoemaker"
 "The Night Before Larry was Stretched"
 "The Twang Man"
 "The Finding of Moses"
 "Father Murphy"
 "Rosemary Fair"
 "The Forgetful Sailor (Johnny Doyle)"
 "Dunlavin Green"
 "The Spanish Lady"
 "The Flower of Magherally"
 "James Connolly"
 "The Ship Carpenter's Wife"
 "The Connereys"
 "Three Weeks We Were Wed"
 "Matt Hyland"
 "The Row in the Town"
 "He Rolled Her to the Wall"

Other recordings by Frank Harte
And Listen To My Song, 1976
Daybreak And A Candle-End, 1987
1798 - The First Year Of Liberty, 1998
My Name Is Napoleon Bonaparte: Traditional Songs On Napoleon Bonaparte, 2001
The Hungry Voice: The Song Legacy Of Ireland's Great Hunger, 2004
There's Gangs Of Them Digging: Songs Of Irish Labour, 2007

References

See also
Frank Harte
Traditional Irish Singers

1973 albums
1967 albums
Topic Records albums
Frank Harte albums